In mathematics, the Malliavin derivative is a notion of derivative in the Malliavin calculus. Intuitively, it is the notion of derivative appropriate to paths in classical Wiener space, which are "usually" not differentiable in the usual sense.

Definition
Let  be the Cameron–Martin space, and  denote classical Wiener space:

;

By the Sobolev embedding theorem, . Let

denote the inclusion map.

Suppose that  is Fréchet differentiable. Then the Fréchet derivative is a map

Denote by  the continuous linear map  defined by

sometimes known as the H-derivative.

Then the Malliavin derivative  is defined by

The Skorokhod integral  is defined to be the adjoint of the Malliavin derivative:

See also
H-derivative

References

Generalizations of the derivative
Stochastic calculus
Paul Malliavin